Mr. Queen is a South Korean television series based on the Chinese web series Go Princess Go. Directed by Yoon Sung-sik, it stars Shin Hye-sun as Queen Cheorin and Kim Jung-hyun as King Cheoljong. The drama is about Queen Cheorin finding herself with the soul of a modern-day man inside her body, and King Cheoljong striving to be a king who helps his people. It aired on tvN every Saturday and Sunday at 21:00 (KST) from December 12, 2020 to February 14, 2021.

Despite its controversies, the series is the ninth highest rated drama in Korean cable television history, with the last episode reached a nationwide rating of 17.371% and garnering more than 4 million in viewership. It also set a record for tvN by achieving the 5th highest rating in the network's history.

Synopsis
In the modern age, Jang Bong-hwan (Choi Jin-hyuk) is a head chef who works at the Blue House. He is a womanizer with a free spirit, and one day gets in trouble when a Chinese delegate takes out a fish hook after biting into their food cooked by him. After a near-death experience one day, he finds himself in the body of So-Yong as Queen Cheorin (Shin Hye-sun) in the Joseon period.

King Cheoljong (Kim Jung-hyun), the reigning monarch, is a gentle and easy-going person. However, he is a King as a figurehead, while the true power is wielded by the late King Sunjo's wife, Queen Sunwon (Bae Jong-ok). Bong-hwan goes on a mission to win Queen Sunwon's favor by cooking for her and try to get back to his body in modern Korea but Bong-hwan soon discovers that So-Yong has a secret while the King is not what he seems, and has a dark and suspicious side to him.

Cast

Main
 Shin Hye-sun as Kim So-yong, Queen Cheorin
 Seo Eun-sol as young Kim So-yong
 The Queen of Joseon who has the soul of a man in her body.

 Kim Jung-hyun as Yi Won-beom, King Cheoljong
 Kim Kang-hoon as young Yi Won-beom
 The 25th King of Joseon.

Supporting

People around Queen Cheorin
 Cha Chung-hwa as Court Lady Choi
A sanggung and Queen Cheorin's devoted lady-in-waiting.
 Chae Seo-eun as Hong-yeon
Queen Cheorin's loyal maid who served her since they were kids.

People around King Cheoljong
 Yoo Min-kyu as Prince Yeongpyeong
Cheoljong's older half-brother who serves as his royal guard.
 Lee Jae-won as Hong Du-il / Hong Byeol-gam
Cheoljong's friend from his days on Ganghwa Island.

Andong Kim clan
 Bae Jong-ok as Grand Royal Queen Dowager Kim (Queen Sunwon)
The late King Sunjo's wife, who wields the true power in the country and, thus, relegates Cheoljong to being just a figurehead.
 Kim Tae-woo as Kim Jwa-geun
Queen Sunwon's younger brother and an extremely ambitious man.
 Na In-woo as Kim Byeong-in
The adopted son of Kim Jwa-geun, thus making him Queen Sunwon's nephew and a cousin to Queen Cheorin.
 Jeon Bae-soo as Kim Mun-geun
Queen Cheorin's father.
 Yoo Young-jae as Kim Hwan
A bright young man who spent his days wandering around the palace and Kim Byeong-in's friend.
  as Chief State Councillor Kim Byung-hak
  as Left State Councillor Kim Seok-geun
  as Minister of Military Affairs Kim Chang-hyuk

Pungyang Jo clan
 Seol In-ah as Jo Hwa-jin, Royal Noble Consort Ui (Jo Gwi-in)
Cheoljong's concubine and first love.
 Jo Yeon-hee as Royal Queen Dowager Jo (Queen Sinjeong)                                                                                                                                                                                                                                                  
The late Crown Prince Hyomyeong's only wife.
  Right State Councillor Jo Man-hong
  as Minister of Personnel Jo Deok-mun
  as Royal Secretary Jo Dae-su
 Jo Hwa-jin's father.

People in the Blue House
 Choi Jin-hyuk as Jang Bong-hwan 
 An arrogant playboy and Blue House chef who is caught in a conspiracy and after a near-death experience, he wakes up in Queen Cheorin's body.
 as Director Han Pyo-jin / Han Shim-ong
  as Bu Seung-min

People in the Royal Kitchen
 Kim In-kwon as Royal Chef Man-bok
 A cuisine specialist who doesn't get along with Queen Cheorin.
 Kang Chae-won as Dam-hyang
 A young court lady who is close with Queen Cheorin.

Court Ladies
 Kim Ju-young as Oh-wol
 Jo Hwa-jin's maid.
  as Court Lady Kang
 Queen Sinjeong's lady-in-waiting.
 Seo Hye-ryeong as court lady
 Ahn Ju-ri as court lady

People in the Royal Palace
 Kang Da-hyun as Hang Sim-hyang
  as royal physician
  as Head Eunuch
  as Eunuch Kim
 Choi Hwan-yi as Eunuch Choi 
  as Sal-su

Special appearances
 Ha Min as Physician Park (Ep. 1)
 Seo Dong-suk as detective (Ep. 1)
 Kwon Eun-soo as court lady (Ep. 2)
 Kim Ka-eun as young court lady (Ep. 2)
 Lee Seung-jin as royal guard (Ep. 2)
 Yoon Jung-ro as royal guard (Ep. 2)
  as general store owner (Ep. 2–3)
 Oh Ji-young as court lady (Ep. 3)
 Na Mi-hee as court lady (Ep. 3)
 Kim Yong-jin as eunuch (Ep. 3)
  as food palanquin bearer (Ep. 6)
 Koo Ja-keon as food palanquin bearer (Ep. 6)
 Kim Seung-wan as food palanquin bearer (Ep. 6)
 Kim Nan-hee as fortune teller (Ep. 6)

Production
In March 2020, Shin Hye-sun was confirmed to be a part of the drama. In June 2020, Kim Jung-hyun, Bae Jong-ok, Kim Tae-woo joined her to play lead roles in the series. In July 2020, Seol In-ah and Yoo Young-jae also joined the cast.

In October the first script reading was held. The stills from filming of the series were released on November 16, 2020.

The series reunites actors Kim Jung-hyun and Seol In-ah who previously acted together in the drama School 2017.

It also marks the second collaboration of Shin Hye-sun with actors Bae Jong-ok, Kim In-kwon and Lee Jae-won with whom she acted in the film Innocence and the dramas Angel's Last Mission: Love and Legend of the Blue Sea, respectively.

On November 24, 2020, filming was stopped as one of the supporting actors tested positive for COVID-19.

Release
From November 4, 2021, the series is available for streaming on Amazon Prime Video.
From February 15, 2023, the series was made available for streaming on Netflix.

Episodes

Spin-off

tvN announced that they would be airing a spin-off titled Mr. Queen: The Secret (official Korean name: Mr. Queen: Bamboo Forest), which featured the secrets and an extended love story of King Cheoljong and Queen Cheorin. It aired exclusively on the streaming service, TVING after the end of the main series' episodes 19 and 20 on February 13–14.

Original soundtrack

Part 1

 
Part 2

Part 3

Part 4

Part 5

Part 6

Part 7

Part 8

Part 9

Mr. Queen: The Bamboo Forest OST

Mr. Queen OST (Various Artists)

Chart performance

Reception

Controversies
Following its airing, a controversy erupted in episode 2 as the series referred to Korea's national treasure, the Veritable Records of the Joseon Dynasty as a "tabloid." This drew outrage among viewers and about 700 people filed complaints to the Korea Communications Standards Commission. The series was also criticised as the author of the original Chinese drama has made negative remarks about Korea in their other work. The producers released a statement clarifying their stance and apologising for the controversies, adding that they were not aware of the negative comments made by the novelist.

Domestic Audience viewership
An 8.0% viewership rating was recorded nationwide for the first episode, making it the second-highest premiere rating of any weekend drama of the network and fifth-highest premiere rating of the network after Hospital Playlist 2, Jirisan, Mr. Sunshine, and Encounter.

As per Nielsen Korea, the final episode logged a national average viewership of 17.37%, breaking its own highest ratings, thereby making the series 9th highest-rated drama in Korean cable television history.

Global Audience viewership
Mr. Queen became the 4th most popular TV show on Netflix a few days after it was made available for streaming on 20th February 2023, as per data provided by FlixPatrol for February 20. Mr. Queen went further up the Netflix Top 10 TV Shows Worldwide Chart.

Mr. Queen took 5th place in the Netflix global viewing hours with 20.9 million viewing hours in its first week after it was made available for streaming on Netflix. It reached Top 10 in TV in 33 countries from  Africa, Asia, and the Americas including Brazil, Bolivia, Ecuador, Mexico, Peru, Kenya, Morocco, Nigeria, Australia, New Zealand, Bangladesh, Hong Kong, Indonesia, India, Malaysia, Pakistan, Philippines, Saudi Arabia, Singapore, South Korea, Sri Lanka, Taiwan, Thailand, Turkey, and Vietnam.

Awards and nominations

Notes

References

External links
  
 Mr. Queen at Daum 
 
 
 Mr. Queen on Viki

TVN (South Korean TV channel) television dramas
2020 South Korean television series debuts
2021 South Korean television series endings
Korean-language television shows
South Korean time travel television series
Alternate history television series
Television series set in the Joseon dynasty
Fiction about body swapping
Television series by Studio Dragon
Television series by YG Entertainment
South Korean historical television series
South Korean comedy television series
South Korean fantasy television series
Television productions suspended due to the COVID-19 pandemic
Television shows based on Chinese novels
South Korean television series based on non-South Korean television series